Saint-Gratien is a commune in the Val-d'Oise department, in the northern suburbs of Paris, France.

History
On August 7, 1850, a part of the territory of Saint-Gratien was detached and merged with a part of the territory of Deuil-la-Barre, a part of the territory of Soisy-sous-Montmorency, and a part of the territory of Épinay-sur-Seine to create the commune of Enghien-les-Bains. On that occasion the commune of Saint-Gratien lost the scenic lake now known as the Lake of Enghien.

Population

Transport
Saint-Gratien is served by Saint-Gratien station on Paris RER line  and by the  bus number 138 going to Paris — Porte de Clichy.

See also
Communes of the Val-d'Oise department

References

External links
Official website 

Association of Mayors of the Val d'Oise 

Communes of Val-d'Oise